Gavrilov (Cyrillic: Гаврилов), or Gavrilova (feminine; Гаврилова) is a Russian last name, derived from the first name "Гаврила", "Гаврило" (Gavrila, Gavrilo, i.e., Gabriel). It was also transliterated in other languages as Gawrilov, Gawriloff, Gavriloff; Belarusian: Haurylau,(Гаўрылаў); Ukrainian: Gavryliv (Гаврилів).

Notable people with the surname include:

Alexander Gavrilov (figure skater) (b. 1943), Soviet figure skater
Andrei Gavrilov (born 1955), a Russian pianist
Andrey Gavrilov (born 1974), a Kazakhstani butterfly swimmer
Andrey Gavrilov (born 1952), a Russian interpreter in film dubbing during the last decades of the 20th century 
Asen Gavrilov (1926–2006), a Bulgarian ballet dancer and choreographer
Boris Anatolyevich Gavrilov, a Russian football coach
Boris Petrovich Gavrilov, a Soviet rugby union player
Daria Gavrilova, a Russian–Australian tennis player
Dmitriy Gavrilov, a Kazakh professional basketball player
Fyodor Gavrilov, a Russian painter of the second half of the 18th century
Illya Hawrylaw, a Belarusian professional football player.
Leonid Gavrilov (born 1954), a Russian-American scientist, and a founder of the reliability theory of aging and longevity
Mikhail Gavrilov (1893-1954), a Russian professor and Catholic writer
Neil Hawryliw (born 1957), a Canadian ice hockey player
Pyotr Mikhailovich Gavrilov (1900–1979), a Soviet army officer and Hero of the Soviet Union
Valentin Gavrilov (born 1946), a Soviet athlete
Yuri Gavrilov (born 1953), a Russian football manager

See also
Gavrilov (crater), a lunar impact crater on the far side of the Moon
 Gavrilov translation.

Slavic-language surnames
Russian-language surnames
Bulgarian-language surnames
Surnames from given names